Jamie McLennan (born June 30, 1971) is a Canadian former professional ice hockey goaltender who is now an analyst for TSN, TSN Radio 1050, NBC Sports and NHL Network. He spent eleven seasons in the National Hockey League with the New York Islanders (1993–96), St. Louis Blues (1997–2000), Minnesota Wild (2000–01), Calgary Flames (2002–04, 2006–07), New York Rangers (2004) and Florida Panthers (2005–06). His active playing career ended in 2008 after a year with the Nippon Paper Cranes of Asia League Ice Hockey. He is popularly known by his nickname Noodles because of his preference for eating homemade pasta instead of diner food on minor-league bus rides before away games.

Playing career
Following a productive season with the Western Hockey League's Lethbridge Hurricanes in which McLennan backstopped the Hurricanes to the WHL Finals, he was drafted in the third round, 48th overall by the New York Islanders in the 1991 NHL Entry Draft. After a two and a half-year stint playing for the Islanders' minor league affiliates in the American, International and East Coast Hockey Leagues, McLennan backed-up veteran Ron Hextall in the 1993–94 season, posting a winning record. He spent the following two seasons with the Islanders organization, alternating between the NHL club and the Islanders' IHL affiliate.

A few weeks after the 1995–96 NHL season had been completed, McLennan drove from Salt Lake City, Utah to Lethbridge, Alberta, on his way home to Edmonton. While visiting family in Lethbridge he fell ill. He went to a hospital on May 6, 1996, after feeling sick all evening, with immobility setting in. What was thought to be the flu turned out to be bacterial meningitis. After nearly dying that day, he spent the following week in intensive care. The Islanders declined to renew his contract on July 1. 

The St. Louis Blues signed him to a contract on July 15. After a relatively quick recovery he spent the following season in the AHL. He returned to the NHL as the Blues' back-up goaltender for the 1997–98 NHL season.  That year he played 30 games, posting 16 wins, two shutouts and a 2.17 goals against average. He was awarded the Bill Masterton Memorial Trophy, awarded to the NHL player who best displays perseverance and dedication to hockey. He was picked off the Blues' roster by the Minnesota Wild in the 2000 NHL Expansion Draft. After a season playing for the expansion Wild, he played the following season in the AHL. 

The Calgary Flames acquired him in a trade at the 2002 NHL Entry Draft, where he again played the role of NHL backup, achieving two wins in 17 decisions. Despite his 2–11–4 record, he remained with the team as Roman Turek's backup. When Turek became injured in the 2003–04 season, McLennan was thrust into the starting role. He played well, but as the season wore, Miikka Kiprusoff, who had been acquired earlier in the season by the Flames, had taken over the starting job. Turek returned, and McLennan was traded to the New York Rangers in March 2004.

Following the season he was signed to a contract by the Florida Panthers. During the cancelled 2004–05 NHL season he played for the British National League's Guildford Flames. He was brought back to Calgary in 2006, once again as backup to Miikka Kiprusoff. The following season, McLennan had a five-week stint in Russia with Metallurg Magnitogorsk before returning to Canada.

On April 21, 2007, during a playoff game versus the Detroit Red Wings (which turned out to be his last NHL game of his career), McLennan slashed Johan Franzén twice in the leg. McLennan was due to be assessed a minor penalty. However, after play was stopped, McLennan violently slashed Franzén in the stomach, resulting in a game misconduct for McLennan. McLennan had entered the game after Kiprusoff had allowed 5 goals. The NHL suspended McLennan for five games and fined coach Jim Playfair $25,000 and the team $100,000 for actions late in Game 5 of the Flames' first-round series against the Detroit Red Wings.

On November 21, 2007, McLennan signed with the Nippon Paper Cranes of Asia League Ice Hockey. McLennan announced his retirement at the end of the 2007–08 season.

Coaching
On July 10, 2008, he was named as the director of goaltender development and as a professional scout for the Calgary Flames. On June 23, 2009, McLennan moved into the coaching staff of the Flames after he was named as an assistant coach to Brent Sutter.

Broadcasting career
McLennan is a full-time NHL analyst on TSN and is a colour commentator for the Toronto Maple Leafs, Ottawa Senators and Winnipeg Jets. He is also a co-host on Overdrive on TSN 1050 and TSN2.

Career statistics

Regular season and playoffs

Awards and honours

References

External links

 

1971 births
Calgary Flames coaches
Calgary Flames players
Calgary Flames scouts
Canadian ice hockey goaltenders
Canadian radio sportscasters
Canadian television sportscasters
Capital District Islanders players
Denver Grizzlies players
Florida Panthers players
Guildford Flames players
Houston Aeros (1994–2013) players
Lethbridge Hurricanes players
Living people
Minnesota Wild players
New York Islanders draft picks
New York Islanders players
New York Rangers players
Nippon Paper Cranes players
Richmond Renegades players
St. Louis Blues players
Salt Lake Golden Eagles (IHL) players
Spokane Chiefs players
Ice hockey people from Edmonton
Utah Grizzlies (IHL) players
Worcester IceCats players
Bill Masterton Memorial Trophy winners
Canadian expatriate ice hockey players in England
Canadian expatriate ice hockey players in the United States
Canadian ice hockey coaches